The Hunan–Hubei–Sichuan–Guizhou Soviet, also spelled as the Hunan–Hupeh–Szechuan-Kweichow Soviet, was a revolutionary base area and constituent part of the Chinese Soviet Republic (1930–1935).

It was established by the Chinese communist general Ho Lung, who had brought his Second Army Group out from the collapsing Hunan–Western Hupeh Soviet. The new Soviet was bolstered in October 1934 by units of the Sixth Army Group (formerly the Eastern Hunan Red Army Independent Division) which had fled the collapsing Hunan–Kiangsi Soviet the previous August. The new soviet's combined force was redesignated the Second Front Red Army, He Long commanding.

The Soviet comprised counties which are located in the modern Chinese prefectures of Western Hunan Tujia-nation and Miao-nation Autonomous (湘西恩施土家族苗族自治州), Hunan, Enshi Tujia-nation & Miao-nation Autonomous (恩施土家族苗族自治州), Hubei, and Tongren (铜仁地区), Kweichow (Guizhou) and in the modern unemprovinced municipal region of Chungking (Chongqing). (From 1997 Chongqing has no longer been part of Sichuan Province; the administrative lines of the 1930s Soviet counties Youyang Tujia-nation and Miao-nation Autonomous (酉阳土家族苗族自治县) and Xiushan Tujia-nation and Miao-nation Autonomous (秀山土家族苗族自治县) thus run to Beijing through Chongqing rather than Chengtu (Chengdu)).

References

External links 

Former socialist republics
Chinese Civil War
Chinese Soviet Republic